Kerry Cooper Vuna (born 7 May 1987) is a professional rugby footballer who plays on the wing for Newcastle Falcons in Premiership Rugby.

Early years
Cooper Vuna is of Tongan descent. He was born in Auckland, New Zealand and grew up in Otahuhu with his family. He has three sisters, and four brothers. He is the older brother of Joseph Vuna.

Vuna played high school rugby union until he was 15, switching to rugby league after being scouted by the New Zealand Warriors. His junior club was the Otahuhu Leopards. And he represented the Auckland Lions in the Bartercard Cup and NSWRL Premier League.

Rugby league career
Vuna signed with the New Zealand Warriors and made his first grade debut late in 2004, in Round 24 against the Parramatta Eels. Vuna went on to play five games for the club over the next three years before leaving, seeking regular game time.

Vuna signed with the Newcastle Knights in mid-2007, seeking to break into first grade. He was picked in the Knights' squad the week he was signed, after the squad suffered several withdrawals. Vuna established himself in the Knights first grade squad, playing in over fifty matches for the club between 2007 and 2010.

In Round 24, 2010 Vuna scored 4 tries against the Brisbane Broncos equalling the Newcastle Knights' club record for most tries in a game.

Representative career
Vuna was selected in the New Zealand national rugby league team' training squad in 2007 but did not make the final squad.

Vuna was also named in the Kiwis' 2008 squad training for the World Cup but played in three matches for Tonga instead. In October 2008 he was named in the final 24-man Tonga squad.

In 2011 Cooper was named in the initial 50-man squad for the Tongan Rugby Union Team for the Rugby World Cup.

Rugby union career

In May 2010, Vuna signed a two-year contract with the Melbourne Rebels. He played the Rebels' pre-season trials against Tonga and Fiji; against the Crusaders he ran on with former Wallabies Stirling Mortlock and Julian Huxley.
He debuted in Super Rugby for the first round of the Rebels season against the Waratahs. He ended the season playing 14 games of the Super Rugby season 2011 and scored 4 tries.

Vuna played his first game for Australia 9 June 2012, against Wales in Brisbane. Vuna played 71 minutes of the Test, the first of a series of three between Wallabies and the visiting Welshmen. Vuna was selected again for the second test, in Melbourne a week later.

In August 2012, Vuna dislocated his shoulder while playing for the Endeavour Hills club. A week later he underwent surgery. According to a Wallabies spokesman, Vuna could expect to face a six-month recovery period. This could see him sidelined until February 2013.

In May 2013, it was announced that Vuna would leave the Rebels at the end of the season to join Japanese Top League club Toshiba Brave Lupus. He joins head coach Damien Hill and fellow Rebels players James O'Connor, Gareth Delve, Ged Robinson, Nick Phipps, Nic Henderson, James King, Tim Davidson and Richard Kingi on the list of departing Rebels at the end of 2013. His last game as a Rebels player was a home game against New Zealand franchise the Highlanders, a match that also turned out to be the last Rebels match for head coach Damien Hill and players James O'Connor, Gareth Delve, Ged Robinson, Nick Phipps and Nic Henderson. In front of over 12,000 spectators, the Rebels overcame a 24-point half-time deficit to achieve a remarkable 38–37 come-from-behind victory over the Highlanders, ending Vuna's tenure as a Rebels player on a winning note, with Vuna scored two tries in the same match. 

On 2 March 2015, Vuna travelled to England to join Worcester Warriors in the Premiership Rugby with immediate effect from the 2015-16 season. Following his release from Worcester, Vuna signed for local rivals Bath for the 2018-19 season.

On 26 June 2019, Vuna signed for Premiership rivals Newcastle Falcons on a two-year deal from the 2019-20 season.

Family
His father, John Vuna, represented Tonga in rugby union.
He has a son called
Lincoln Vuna

References

External links
2016 Worcester Warriors profile
Melbourne Rebels profile
Rugby League Project statistics

1987 births
Living people
ACS Tomitanii Constanța players
Auckland rugby league team players
Australia international rugby union players
Australian rugby union players
Bath Rugby players
Central Coast Centurions players
Cessnock Goannas players
Expatriate rugby union players in Australia
Expatriate rugby union players in England
Expatriate rugby union players in Japan
Expatriate rugby union players in Romania
Melbourne Rebels players
New Zealand expatriate rugby union players
New Zealand expatriate sportspeople in Australia
New Zealand rugby union players
New Zealand rugby league players
New Zealand sportspeople of Tongan descent
Newcastle Falcons players
Newcastle Knights players
New Zealand Warriors players
Otahuhu Leopards players
People educated at Otahuhu College
Rugby league players from Auckland
Rugby league wingers
Rugby union centres
Rugby union players from Auckland
Tamaki Titans players
Tonga international rugby union players
Tonga national rugby league team players
Tongan rugby union players
Toshiba Brave Lupus Tokyo players